FabricLive.46 is a 2009 album by LTJ Bukem. The album was released as part of the FabricLive Mix Series.

Track listing
  Greg Packer - "People's Music" (Good Looking)
  Tidal - "Impressions" (Good Looking)
  Furney - "Eerie Indiana" (Spacefunk Records)
  Villem - "Inflated Tear" (Madcap's Remix)" (Good Looking)
  Paul SG ft. Eros - "Forever" (Good Looking)
  Paul SG ft. Caine - "Lay Down" (Solful Music)
  Paul SG ft. Andy Sim - "Sweet and Fresh" (Solful Music)
  Locksmith - "2 Minds" (Good Looking)
  Specific - "Time" (Good Looking)
  Furney - "Jambaleno" (Good Looking)
  Phatplayaz - "Fact of the Unknown" (Good Looking)
  Furney - "Rhodeo Drive" (Spacefunk Records)
  Eveson - "Kodama" (Good Looking)
  Furney - "Fearz" (Spacefunk Records)
  Tayla - "Turn It Around" (Good Looking)
  Locksmith - "I'm Not Where You Are" (Good Looking)
  Furney - "Rhodes for D" (Good Looking)
  Syncopix - "So in Need" (Good Looking)

References

External links
Fabric: FabricLive.46

Fabric (club) albums
2009 compilation albums